Findlay "Lindy" Kerr (January 16, 1897 – November 1980) was an American soccer goalkeeper who spent one season in the National Association Football League and nine in the American Soccer League. He also earned one cap with the United States men's national soccer team. He was born in Millport, Isle of Cumbrae, Scotland.

Professional
Some sources state that Kerr began his career in the Scottish League.  Regardless, he  signed with the U.S. club Bethlehem Steel during the 1920-1921 National Association Football League (NAFBL) season.  His first start came in a 9-0 win over Disston A.A. on January 12, 1921.  The NAFBL folded at the end of the season, to be replaced by the first American Soccer League.  With the change in league, the owners of Bethlehem Steel moved the team to Philadelphia, renaming it the Philadelphia Field Club.  Kerr spent the 1921-1922 ASL season in Philadelphia, then moved with the team back to Bethlehem the next season.  In October 1923, he moved to the Fall River Marksmen.  The Marksmen won the 1924, 1925 and 1926 league titles in addition to the 1924 National Challenge Cup championship.  By the 1926-1927 season, Kerr was serving mostly as a backup and on August 19, 1927, the Marksmen traded Kerr to J&P Coats for Ned Tate and a player to be named later (Tommy Martin).  In 1928, the team was sold to new owners who renamed the team the Pawtucket Rangers.  Kerr retired in 1930.

National team
Kerr earned his cap with the U.S. national team in a 6-2 win over Canada on November 6, 1926.

See also
List of United States men's international soccer players born outside the United States

References

External links
 National Soccer Hall of Fame eligibility profile

1897 births
1980 deaths
American soccer players
American Soccer League (1921–1933) players
Association football goalkeepers
Bethlehem Steel F.C. (1907–1930) players
Fall River Marksmen players
J&P Coats players
National Association Football League players
Pawtucket Rangers players
Philadelphia Field Club players
Footballers from North Ayrshire
Scottish emigrants to the United States
United States men's international soccer players
Sportspeople from Scottish islands